The Laufen Hut sits at an elevation of  in the Tennengebirge (Tennen Mountains) at the foot of the Fritzerkogel mountain in the Austrian state of Salzburg. The Laufen Alpine club hut is operated as a self-service facility as a major base for numerous climbing routes, circular routes, and crossings, as well as hiking on the plateau of the Tennengebirge, and ski touring.

History and facilities 

The hut is named after the nearby German town of Laufen (Salzach) and is managed by the German Alpine Club, though it is just across the border in Austria. The hut was built in 1925 and 1926 by the German Alpine Club and Austrian Alpine Club. The first expansion occurred between 1952–1955. Its present appearance dates from the years 1997–2000. In this period the hut was extensively renovated, extended and converted. In addition, the energy supply of the hut was improved to embrace the latest technology:

 Photovoltaic system with a total capacity 1760 W, voltage 24 V, 230 V inverter, rated capacity of 800 Ah
 Cogeneration plant that runs on vegetable oil, electric power 10 kVA, 21 kW thermal power, about 87% efficiency

Drinks and dishes are available at the hut. In 2001 the Laufen Hut was awarded the environmental seal of approval of the Alpine Associations. There is a climbing garden nearby. Currently there are three sectors with 22 routes which range from the lower third to the lower 7th difficulty level of the International Mountaineering and Climbing Federation.

Summits that can be ascended from the Laufen Hut include Fritzerkogel and  Bleikogel.

See also 
 Simony Hut, at the foot of the Hoher Dachstein in Upper Austria.

References

Further reading

External links 
 Laufen section of the German Alpine Club 
 Laufen Hut climbing garden 

Buildings and structures in Upper Austria
Mountain huts in Austria
Tennen Mountains